The Brienzer Rothorn is a mountain of the Emmental Alps, in Switzerland. To its west lies the Tannhorn, whilst to its east are Arnihaaggen, Höch Gumme and the Brünig Pass. On its south side it overlooks Lake Brienz, whilst to the north it looks out over the Waldemme valley.

Administratively, the summit is shared by the municipalities of Brienz, to the south-west, Schwanden bei Brienz, to the south-east, Giswil to the north-east, and Flühli, to the north-west. Brienz and Schwanden bei Brienz are in the canton of Bern, Giswil is in the canton of Obwalden, and Flühli is in the canton of Lucerne. The Brienzer Rothorn is the highest point in the canton of Lucerne.

It can also be reached from Sörenberg, in Flühli, by cable car.

Gallery

See also
List of mountains of Switzerland
List of mountains of Switzerland accessible by public transport

References

External links

Brienzer Rothorn on Hikr

Mountains of the Alps
Mountains of Switzerland
Emmental Alps
Tourist attractions in Switzerland
Highest points of Swiss cantons
Mountains of the canton of Bern
Mountains of Obwalden
Mountains of the canton of Lucerne
Bern–Obwalden border
Bern–Lucerne border
Lucerne–Obwalden border
Two-thousanders of Switzerland